No. 682 Squadron RAF was a photo reconnaissance squadron of the Royal Air Force during the Second World War.

History
The squadron was formed on 1 February 1943 at Maison Blanche, Algeria from No. 4 Photographic Reconnaissance Unit (PRU) RAF. It was at first equipped with Spitfire PR.IVs and -shortly- Mosquito PR.IVs and PR.VIs, and later flew the Spitfire PR.XI in support of the campaign in Tunisia, Sicily, and then Italy.
The squadron supported the invasion of Italy and carried out sorties over Yugoslavia including special reconnaissance for army and commando operations. In 1944 the squadron began to target southern France and it moved detachments to France in September 1944, receiving the superlative photographic reconnaissance version of the Spitfire, the PR.XIX.
It returned to cover the Italian campaign and also operated over Greece. With the war over the squadron carried survey flights until it was disbanded on 14 September 1945 at Peretola, Italy.

Aircraft operated

Squadron bases

Commanding officers

See also
List of Royal Air Force aircraft squadrons

References

Notes

Bibliography

External links

 Squadron Histories and more for Nos. 671–1435 Squadron on RAFweb
 History of 682 Squadron

682 Squadron
682
Military units and formations established in 1943
Aircraft squadrons of the Royal Air Force in World War II
Military units and formations disestablished in 1945